John McLeod Campbell,  (6 July 1884 – 26 February 1961) was an English Anglican priest, chaplain, and missionary. He served as fellow and chaplain of Hertford College, Oxford, from 1909 to 1924, as principal of Trinity College, Kandy from 1924 to 1935, as general secretary of the Overseas Council (formerly the Missionary Council) of the Church Assembly from 1935 to 1953, Master of Charterhouse from 1954 to 1961, and as Chaplain to the Speaker of the House of Commons from 1955 until his death in 1961. He additionally served as a military chaplain during the First World War.

Early life and education
Campbell was born on 6 July 1884 to Donald Campbell, Rector of Oakford, Devon, England.

References

External links
 

1884 births
1961 deaths
20th-century English Anglican priests
Fellows of Hertford College, Oxford
Chaplains of the House of Commons (UK)
English Anglican missionaries
Anglican missionaries in Sri Lanka
Recipients of the Military Cross
Honorary Chaplains to the Queen
People from Mid Devon District
Royal Army Chaplains' Department officers
World War I chaplains
Clergy from Devon